This is a list of members of the Tasmanian House of Assembly, elected at the 1992 state election:

 Greens member Bob Brown resigned in early 1993 to contest a seat in the Australian House of Representatives at the 1993 federal election. Peg Putt was elected in the resulting countback on 26 February.
 Labor member Michael Aird resigned in early 1995. John Sheppard was elected in the resulting countback on 10 April.
 Greens member Gerry Bates resigned in early 1995. Mike Foley was elected in the resulting countback on 15 May.
 Liberal member Robin Gray resigned in late 1995. Denise Swan was elected in the resulting countback on 15 December.
 Liberal member Ian Braid resigned in late 1995. No countback was held due to the proximity of the next election.

Distribution of seats

Members of Tasmanian parliaments by term
20th-century Australian politicians